"Hoops" is a song by Australian alternative rock band The Rubens. It was the second single released from their second studio album, Hoops.

The track was voted in at number 1 on the Triple J Hottest 100, 2015.

Band member Sam Margin said, "'Hoops' came as we were getting mixes on what we thought was the finished album. We kept writing just for something to keep us occupied, but when this one came up we felt it had to be on the album. It's about being in a relationship with someone who does damaging things to keep you close, when really their actions are pointless because you love them despite it all."

Music video
The music video was released on 11 August 2015.

Charts

Weekly charts
"Hoops" entered the Australian charts at number 48 in August 2015 and peaked at number 9 in February 2016.

Year-end charts

Certification

References

2015 songs
2015 singles
The Rubens songs